Nathalie Giguère (born January 16, 1973) is a former breaststroke swimmer from Canada, who competed for her native country at the 1992 Summer Olympics in Barcelona, Spain. There she finished in sixth position in the women's 200-metre breaststroke.

Giguère was also an Olympic torch relay runner in Châteauguay, Quebec, for the 2010 Winter Olympics in Vancouver, British Columbia.

References
 Canadian Olympic Committee

1973 births
Living people
Canadian female breaststroke swimmers
Commonwealth Games gold medallists for Canada
French Quebecers
Olympic swimmers of Canada
Swimmers from Quebec City
Swimmers at the 1992 Summer Olympics
Commonwealth Games medallists in swimming
Swimmers at the 1990 Commonwealth Games
Laval Rouge et Or athletes
20th-century Canadian women
Medallists at the 1990 Commonwealth Games